Emma Elizabeth Russell (born 18 August 1995) is a Danish ice hockey player and member of the Danish national ice hockey team, currently playing with the Rødovre Mighty Bulls Q of the KvindeLigaen.

Russell has represented Denmark at seven IIHF Women's World Championships: the Top Division tournament in 2021, the Division I Group A tournaments in 2013, 2014, 2015, 2016, and 2017, and the Group B tournament in 2012.

References

External links 
 

Living people
1995 births
Danish women's ice hockey forwards
Ice hockey players at the 2022 Winter Olympics
Olympic ice hockey players of Denmark